Dead Game is a 1923 American silent Western film directed by Edward Sedgwick and featuring Hoot Gibson.

Cast
 Hoot Gibson as "Katy" Didd (credited as Ed "Hoot" Gibson)
 Robert McKim as Prince Tetlow
 Harry Carter as Jenks
 Laura La Plante as Alice Mason
 William Welsh as Harlu
 Tony West as Hiram
 William Steele as Sam Antone (credited as William A. Steele)
 Alfred Allen as Undetermined Role (uncredited)

See also
 List of American films of 1923
 Hoot Gibson filmography

References

External links
 

1923 films
1923 Western (genre) films
American black-and-white films
Films directed by Edward Sedgwick
Universal Pictures films
Silent American Western (genre) films
1920s American films
1920s English-language films